The Freddie Mercury Tribute Concert for AIDS Awareness was a benefit concert held on Easter Monday, 20 April 1992, at Wembley Stadium in London, United Kingdom for an audience of 72,000. The concert was produced for television by Ray Burdis, directed by David Mallet and broadcast live on television and radio to 76 countries around the world, with an audience of up to one billion. The concert was a tribute to Queen's lead vocalist, Freddie Mercury, who died of AIDS on 24 November 1991. 

The show marked bassist John Deacon's final full-length concert with Queen (save a short live appearance with Brian May, Roger Taylor and Elton John in 1997). The profits from the concert were used to launch the Mercury Phoenix Trust, an AIDS charity organization.

History 
Following Freddie Mercury's death on 24 November 1991 from AIDS, the remaining members of Queen (John Deacon, Brian May and Roger Taylor) came together with their manager, Jim Beach, to organise a concert to celebrate the life and legacy of Mercury, and to raise money for AIDS research and spread awareness about the disease. In the 1992 BRIT Awards ceremony, May and Taylor announced plans for the concert. When tickets finally went on sale, all 72,000 tickets sold out in just three hours, even though no performers were announced apart from the remaining members of Queen.

Concert 

The concert opened with a message from the three remaining members of Queen in tribute to Mercury. The music then commenced with short sets from artists that were influenced by the music of Queen, including Metallica, Extreme (playing a Queen medley), Def Leppard (who brought Brian May onstage for a version of "Now I'm Here"), and Guns N' Roses. Between bands, several video clips honouring Freddie Mercury were shown while roadies changed the stage for the following act's performance. Elizabeth Taylor then gave an AIDS prevention speech, which was followed by a compilation of Mercury's various interactions with audiences.

The second half of the concert featured the three remaining Queen members – John Deacon (on bass), Brian May (on guitar) and Roger Taylor (on drums) – along with guest singers and guitarists, including Elton John, Roger Daltrey (of The Who), Tony Iommi (of Black Sabbath), Ian Hunter, David Bowie, Mick Ronson, James Hetfield (of Metallica), George Michael, Seal, Paul Young, Annie Lennox, Lisa Stansfield, Robert Plant (of Led Zeppelin), Joe Elliott and Phil Collen (of Def Leppard), Axl Rose and Slash (of Guns N' Roses), Liza Minnelli, and others. Via satellite from Sacramento, California, U2 dedicated a live performance of "Until the End of the World" to Mercury.

Home releases 

The concert was originally released in VHS form (usually in two-tape releases worldwide), but due to time limitations, "Love of My Life" and "More Than Words" by Extreme, "Animal" and "Let's Get Rocked" by Def Leppard, Spinal Tap's "The Majesty of Rock", U2's "Until The End of the World", Mango Groove's "Special Star" and Robert Plant's version of "Innuendo" were removed from the original release. The US release also omitted Bob Geldof's performance of "Too Late God", and Zucchero's performance of "Las Palabras de Amor".

In April 2002, for the 10th anniversary of the Mercury Phoenix Trust, the second half of the concert (featuring the performances by the surviving members of Queen) was released on DVD and entered the UK charts at No. 1. "Innuendo" was not included on the DVD, at Plant's request. In addition, the original 4:3 footage had been cropped down to widescreen. The DVD was certified Gold in Poland.

On 24 June 2013, Queen announced on their Facebook page that a new remastered version of the concert would be released in late 2013 on DVD and Blu-ray. The DVD and Blu-ray was released on 2 September 2013. Like the earlier VHS release, this version excludes Extreme's "Love of My Life" and "More Than Words", Def Leppard's "Animal" and "Let's Get Rocked", performance by Spinal Tap, U2 and Mango Groove from the opening acts segment, and Plant's "Innuendo" from the Queen+ segment. It was certified Platinum in the UK.

Clips of rehearsals and of Metallica's set (as well as James Hetfield's performance of "Stone Cold Crazy" with Queen and Tony Iommi) were featured in the 1992 documentary A Year and a Half in the Life of Metallica.

In May 2020, Queen announced that they would be premiering the concert on YouTube to raise money for the COVID-19 Solidarity Response Fund. It was available for 48 hours. In April 2022, Queen streamed the concert again to celebrate the 30th anniversary of the concert as well as the Mercury Phoenix Trust.

Several songs from the concert have also been released in audio-only format: 
Metallica's three-song performance was made into a UK tour edition single for "Nothing Else Matters", entitled Live at Wembley Stadium and released in Europe just one week after the concert, on 27 April 1992. The band later released in 2021 a re-mixed and re-mastered version of their performance as well as a rendition of Queen's Stone Cold Crazy with James Hetfield and Tony Iommi on the remastered box set of their album Metallica. 
Guns N' Roses' performance of "Knockin' on Heaven's Door" was released in May 1992 as a double A-side, with the band's studio recording of the song; it was also featured on their album Live Era '87–'93. The single entered the UK charts at No. 2. 
Def Leppard released their version of "Now I'm Here" (with May) from the concert, as a B-side to their single "Tonight" in April 1993.
an EP of the George Michael performances with Queen was released as Five Live in April 1993. It entered the UK singles chart at No. 1. 
the Queen + Ian Hunter, Mick Ronson, David Bowie and Def Leppard performance of the song "All the Young Dudes" was released on the Mick Ronson album 'Heaven and Hull'.
the Queen + David Bowie performances of the songs "All the Young Dudes" and "Heroes" were released on the soundtrack album to the 2018 film Beside Bowie: The Mick Ronson Story.

Performances

Without Queen 
Metallica – "Enter Sandman", "Sad but True", "Nothing Else Matters"
Extreme – Queen Medley (including "Mustapha" (intro), "Bohemian Rhapsody" (Rock Section), "Keep Yourself Alive", "I Want To Break Free", "Fat Bottomed Girls", "Bicycle Race", "Another One Bites The Dust", "We Will Rock You", "Stone Cold Crazy" and "Radio Ga Ga"), “Love Of My Life” and "More Than Words" (Gary Cherone and Nuno Bettencourt)
Def Leppard – "Animal", "Let's Get Rocked", "Now I'm Here" (With Brian May)
Bob Geldof – "Too Late God"
Spinal Tap – "The Majesty of Rock"
U2 – "Until the End of the World" – beamed via satellite, pre-recorded on 18 April in Oakland, California. Cindy Crawford announces as "via satellite... straight from Sacramento, California".
Guns N' Roses – "Paradise City", "Only Women Bleed", "Knockin' on Heaven's Door"
Mango Groove – "Special Star" – played via satellite from Johannesburg, South Africa
Elizabeth Taylor – AIDS Prevention Speech
Freddie Mercury – compilation of various interactions with the audience

With Queen 
Queen + Joe Elliott and Slash – "Tie Your Mother Down"
Queen + Roger Daltrey and Tony Iommi – "Heaven and Hell" (intro), "Pinball Wizard" (intro), "I Want It All"
Queen + Zucchero – "Las Palabras de Amor"
Queen + Gary Cherone and Tony Iommi – "Hammer to Fall"
Queen + James Hetfield and Tony Iommi – "Stone Cold Crazy"
Queen + Robert Plant – "Innuendo" (including parts of "Kashmir"), "Thank You" (intro), "Crazy Little Thing Called Love"
Brian May + Spike Edney – "Too Much Love Will Kill You"
Queen + Paul Young – "Radio Ga Ga"
Queen + Seal – "Who Wants to Live Forever"
Queen + Lisa Stansfield – "I Want to Break Free"
Queen + David Bowie and Annie Lennox – "Under Pressure"
Queen + Ian Hunter, David Bowie, Mick Ronson, Joe Elliott and Phil Collen – "All the Young Dudes"
Queen + David Bowie and Mick Ronson – "Heroes"
David Bowie – "Lord's Prayer"
Queen + George Michael – "'39"
Queen + George Michael and Lisa Stansfield – "These Are the Days of Our Lives"
Queen + George Michael – "Somebody to Love"
Queen + Elton John and Axl Rose – "Bohemian Rhapsody" using the same light show as The Magic Tour from 1986 for the opera section, and vocals played from a tape using the original 1970s’ studio recording featuring Freddie Mercury.
Queen + Elton John and Tony Iommi – "The Show Must Go On"
Queen + Axl Rose – "We Will Rock You"
Queen + Liza Minnelli, supported by the rest of the cast – "We Are the Champions"
Queen – "God Save the Queen" (taped outro)

Queen's activity 
 Freddie Mercury – pre-recorded piano and vocals (on "Bohemian Rhapsody") and compilation of various interactions with the audience during the section before the Queen + section of the concert.
 Brian May – electric and acoustic guitars, keyboards (on "Too Much Love Will Kill You" and "Who Wants To Live Forever"), lead vocals (on "Tie Your Mother Down" for 1st verse, then co-lead vocals with Roger Taylor on 1st chorus on "Tie Your Mother Down" and "Too Much Love Will Kill You"), co-lead vocals (on "I Want It All"), backing vocals
 Roger Taylor – drums, tambourine, backing vocals, co-lead vocals (on "Tie Your Mother Down" with Brian May on 1st chorus, and on "Under Pressure" as a trio with David Bowie and Annie Lennox on choruses).
 John Deacon – bass guitar, backing vocals

Guest musicians 
 Elton John – piano on "Bohemian Rhapsody"
 Slash – electric guitar on "Tie Your Mother Down"
 Tony Iommi – electric guitar on "Heaven and Hell" (intro), "Pinball Wizard" (intro), "I Want It All", "Hammer to Fall", "Stone Cold Crazy" and "The Show Must Go On"
 Ian Hunter – electric guitar on "All the Young Dudes"
 Mick Ronson – electric guitar on "All the Young Dudes" and "Heroes" 
 David Bowie – alto saxophone on "All the Young Dudes"
 Joe Elliott – backing vocals on "All the Young Dudes"
 Phil Collen – backing vocals on "All the Young Dudes"

Backing musicians 
Queen were backed by the following musicians:
 Spike Edney – keyboards, piano, backing vocals
 Mike Moran – piano on "Who Wants to Live Forever" and "Somebody to Love"
 Josh Macrae – percussion in some Queen tracks
 Chris Thompson – backing vocals, acoustic guitar on "I Want It All", "Crazy Little Thing Called Love" and "Heroes", additional percussion
 Maggie Ryder – backing vocals
 Miriam Stockley – backing vocals
 London Community Gospel Choir – backing vocals on "Somebody to Love" and "We Are the Champions"
 John Jones – organ and backing vocals on "We Are the Champions"

Certifications and sales

References

External links 

Transcript of the DVD edition

Queen (band) video albums
Benefit concerts in the United Kingdom
Freddie Mercury
Tribute concerts in the United Kingdom
Concerts at Wembley Stadium
1992 in London
1992 in music
Hollywood Records video albums
April 1992 events in the United Kingdom
HIV/AIDS